The genus name Acanthocarpus may refer to:
Acanthocarpus (plant), a genus of monocots currently placed in the Asparagaceae
Acanthocarpus (crab), a genus of crabs in the family Calappidae